Khvoshchevatka is a rural locality (a selo) in Novozhivotinnovskoye Rural Settlement, Ramonsky District, Voronezh Oblast, Russia. The population was 216 as of 2010. There are 29 streets.

Geography 
Khvoshchevatka is located on the right bank of the Don River, 22 km southwest of Ramon (the district's administrative centre) by road. Novozhivotinnoye is the nearest rural locality.

References 

Rural localities in Ramonsky District